Mario Pani (born 13 May 1936) is a Mexican former sports shooter. He competed in the skeet event at the 1968 Summer Olympics.

References

1936 births
Living people
Mexican male sport shooters
Olympic shooters of Mexico
Shooters at the 1968 Summer Olympics
Sportspeople from Mexico City